Blackbrook may refer to several places in the United Kingdom:

 Blackbrook, Cheshire, England
 Blackbrook, Derbyshire, England
 Blackbrook, London, in the London Borough of Bromley, near Southborough
 Blackbrook, St Helens, England
 Blackbrook, Staffordshire, England
 Blackbrook, Surrey, England

See also 

 Blackbrook Reservoir, Leicestershire, England
 Blackbrook River, Devon, England